Andy Mullen was the quarterback for the 1933 Toronto Argonauts of the Canadian Football League. He guided his team to the CFL championship in 1933, the 21st Grey Cup.

References

Canadian football quarterbacks
Toronto Argonauts players
Year of birth missing
Year of death missing
Place of birth missing
Place of death missing